This is a list of curling clubs in Scotland. They are organized by the Royal Caledonian Curling Club which oversees curling in Scotland.

The RCCC has divided Scotland up into 13 areas.

Unlike curling clubs in other parts of the world, curling clubs in Scotland are not synonymous with the rink the play out of. Most rinks have several rinks playing out of them.

Curling rinks
Auchenharvie Leisure Centre, Stevenston 
Ayr Ice Rink, Ayr
Border Ice Rink, Kelso
Braehead Curling, Glasgow (closed)
Curl Aberdeen, Aberdeen
Curl Edinburgh, Edinburgh
Dumfries Ice Bowl, Dumfries
Dundee Ice Arena, Dundee 
East Kilbride Ice Rink, East Kilbride 
Fife Ice Arena, Kirkcaldy
Forfar Indoor Sports, Forfar
Galleon Centre, Kilmarnock
Greenacres Curling Rink, Howwood 
Inverness Ice Centre, Inverness
Kinross Curling, Kinross
Lanarkshire Ice Rink, Hamilton
Live Active Dewars Centre, Perth
Lockerbie Ice Rink, Lockerbie 
Moray Leisure Centre, Elgin
Stranraer Ice Rink, Stranraer 
The Peak, Stirling
Waterfront Leisure Complex, Greenock

Area 1 (Ayrshire)
Ayr Curling Club
Ayr & Alloway Curling Club
Ayr Country
Ayr Junior Curling Club
Ayr St. Columba
Beresford Ladies
Carnell
Construction South
Crosshill
Cumnock & District
Dalmellington Craigengillan Curling Club
Darvel Curling Club
Disnae Virtual Club
Dundonald
Fairywell
Fullarton Curling Club
Galston Haymouth Curling Club
Gangrels Curling Club
Garnock Academy
Harvies Young Curlers
Irvine Curling Club
Kilwinning Eglinton
Kirkoswald
Land O Burns
Mardi Ladies
NHS Ayrshire & Arran
Sorn Curling Club
St Leonards
Stewarton Academy
Stewarton Heather Curling Club
Symington
Tarbolton Curling Club
Troon Portland Curling Club

Area 2 (Galloway & Rhins of Galloway)
Castle Kennedy
Glasserton
Kirkcowan
Kirkinner
Kirkmabreck
Leswalt
Limekiln Loch
Loch Connel
Logan
Minnigaff
Penninghame
Portpatrick
Stoneykirk
Stranraer Academy
Stranraer Ice Rink
Stranraer Wheelchair
Virtually Curlers
Wigtown

Area 3 (Dumfriesshire & Stewartry)
Annan
Applegarth & Sibbaldbie
Borgue
Caerlaverock
Cairn
Corrie
Craigielands
Crocketford
Dalbeattie
Dalbeattie High School
Dryfesdale
Dumfries Curling Club
Dumfries Academy
Dumfries High School
Dumfries Ice Bowl Curling Ass.
Dumfries Ice Bowl Virtual Club
Dumfries Young Curlers
Durisdeer
Eskdale
Gretna & Border
Holywood
Hutton
Johnstone & District
Kirkcudbright Country
Kirkmahoe
Kirkpatrick-Durham
Lochmaben Castle Curling Club
Lochrutton
Lockerbie Academy
Lockerbie Virtual
Lockerbie Wheelchair
Morton
New Abbey
Nithsdale Ladies
Parton
Ruthwell
Sanquhar Upper Nithsdale
St. Joseph's College
Threave Ladies
Tongland
Twynholm
Waterbeck

Area 4 (Border)
Ayton Castle
Border Curling Dev. Group
Borders Virtual
Borders Wheelchair
Borders Young Curlers
Chirnside
Coldstream & Hirsel
Duns
Earlston
Earlston High School
Eildon
Foulden
Gala Water
Greenlaw
Jedburgh
Kelso
Kelso High School
Lammermuir
Lauderdale
Lees
Roxburghe
Selkirk
St Boswells
Swinton
Teviotdale

Area 5 (Argyll & Renfrewshire)
Alternative Curling Club
Ardgowan
Ardgowan Castle
Auchenames
Beith Morishill
Between the Sheets
Benmore & Kilmun Curling Club
Blythswood Curling Club
Breadalbane Glenorchy
Bridge of Weir
Bute Curling Club
Brookfield 
Canadian
Clydeview Academy
Dalry Union Curling Club
Dunoon Argyll Curling Club
Dunoon Ladies Curling Club
Druids
Erskine Curling Club
Gleniffer Curling Club
Gourock Club
Gourock Ladies
Greenacres Ladies
Greenacres Young Curlers
Greenock Ladies
Gryffe High School
Howwood
Kilmalcolm
Largs Thistle
Loch Goil Curling Club
Lockwinnoch
Millport Curling Club
Muirdykes
Neilston
Newark Curling Club
Oban Curling Club
Old Grammarians
Paisley St Mirren Curling Club
Port Glasgow Curling Club
Reform Curling Club
Skelmorlie
Tignabruich Curling Club
Uplawmoor
Upper Cowal Curling Club
Waterfront Junior
Whitecraigs Curling & Sporting Soc.

Area 6 (Bigar District & Upper Clydesdale, Lanarkshire)
Avondale Heather
Bellshill
Biggar
Bothwell Ladies
Cadzow
Calder
Cambusnethan
Coulter
Dippool
Douglas
East Kilbride 
East Kilbride & Haremyres
East Kilbride Junior
East Kilbride Virtual
Hamilton & Thornyhill
Hamilton Ice Sports Club
Hamilton Ladies
Hamilton Virtual
Hamilton Young Curlers
Lanark
Lanark Ladies
Lesmahagow
Lesmahagow Ladies Section
New Bothwell
New Monklands
South Lanarkshire Wheelchair
Strathaven Golf
Strathkelvin
Stra'ven Ladies
Upperward Ladies
Wirsels Ladies
Wishaw

Area 7 (Dunbartonshire & Glasgow)
69
Alma
Bank of Scotland (Glasgow)
Bearsden
Bearsden Ski Club
Beechnuts
Braehead Rockers
Braehead Virtual
Braehead Wheelchair
Braehead Young Curlers
Cadder
Cambuslang
Cardross
Carmunnock & Rutherglen
Cathcart Castle
Cawder House
Clydesdale Bank (Glasgow)
Crossmyloof
Curlews
Drystanes
Dumbarton
Dumbreck Ladies
Duntocher
Duntocher Ladies
Eaglesham
Giffnock
Glasgow Academicals
Glasgow & District Rotary
Glasgow Ladies
Glasgow Ptarmigan
Glasgow XX
Harlequins
Helensburgh
Kelvinside Academical
Kelvinside Academy
Maxwell Ladies
Nondescripts
Old Grenalmond
Patrick
Pollock
Rolling Stones
The Stones
Whitecraigs LTSC

Area 8 (East Lothian, Midlothian, Peeblesshire)
37 Club
Abbotsford Curling Soc.
Aberlady Curling Club
Athelstaneford Curling Club
Bank of Scotland (Edinburgh) Curling Club
Barbarians Curling Club
Boswall Curling Club
Broughton United
Bruntsfield Curling Soc.
Carrington Curling Club
Chartered Surveyors (Edinburgh)
Clydesdale Bank (Edinburgh)
Coates
Colinton Ladies
Corstorphine Curling Club
Corstorphine Ladies Curling Club
Crerar Seniors
Currie & Balerno Curling Club
D.A.F.S. Curling Club
Dalkeith
Dirleton
Dominies
Duddingston Curling Club
East Linton Curling Club
Eddleston
Edinburgh Curling Club
Edinburgh Academicals
Edinburgh B.M.A. Ladies
Edinburgh Ladies
Edinburgh Medical
Edinburgh New Stones Virtual
Edinburgh Rotary
ESMS (Mary Erskine)
ESMS (Stewart's Melville)
Ford Ladies
George Heriot's FP
George Heriot's School
George Watson's College
Gogar Park Curling Club
Gogar Park Young Curlers
Haddington Curling Club
Haymarket
Holyrood Curling Club
Lothian Ladies
Lothian Wheelchair
Markle Outdoor Curling Soc. 
Merchiston Curling Club
Mid Calder Curling Club
Musketeers
Musselburgh
Newlands & Tarthwater
Newmills
North Berwick Doocot
Oxenoord
Peebles Curling Club
Penicuik Curling Club
Pentland Ladies Curling Club
Police Scotland (East)
Royal Bank of Scotland Curling Club (Edinburgh)
SIAE Curling Club
St. George's School for Girls
Stewart's Melville F.P.
Stray Dogs
St Ronans Curling Club
Sweepers
Watsonian Curling Club
West Linton
Yester

Area 9 (Central, Forth & Endrick, Stirlingshire, West Lothian)
Abercorn Curling Club
Airthrey Castle Curling Club
Balfron
Bathgate
Blairdrummond
Bonnybridge
Borestone & Stirling
Bridge of Allan
Buccaners
Buchan
Buchylvie
Callander & Trossachs
Campsie Glen
Castle
Denny Curling Club
Dollar Ladies
Doune
Drymen
Dunblane
Dunblane High School
Falkirk Curling Club
Falkirk Ice Rink Curling Club
Falkirk Ladies Curling Club
Falkirk Ladies (1960)
Fintry Curling Club
Forest Hills Trossachs Curling Club
Forth Valley Ladies
Grangemouth
Keir
Kilsyth Curling Club
Kilsyth Ladies
Kippen
Larbert Curling Club
Laurieston and Zetland Curling Club
Lenzie Ladies
Linlithgow Curling Club
Livingston Curling Club
Loch Ard
Oatridge Curling Club
Old Fellows
On the Button
Port of Menteith
Sauchie & Bannockburn Curling Club
Stirling High School
Stirling Ice Rink Senior Ladies
Stirling Virtual
Stirling Wheelchair
Stirling Young Curlers
Strathendrick Curling Club
Torbrex
Uphall Curling Club
West Stirlingshire Ladies

Area 10 (Cupar, East of Fife, West of Fife, Loch Leven)
Abdie Curling Club
Abdie Ladies Curlign Club
Aberdour Curling Club
Balcaskie Curling Club
Bank of Scotland (Fife) Curling Club
Beath High School
Bishopshire
Boreland Curling Club
Broomhall
Cambo
Ceres Curling Club
Crawford Priory
Cupar Curling Club
Dalgety Bay Curling Club
Disabled Curlers Scotland (DICE)
Dollar Academy
Dollar & Devon Vale
Dunfermline Curling Club
Dunfermline Ladies Curling Club
Falkland Curling Club
Fife Ice Arena Virtual
Fossoway Curling Club
Fossway Ladies
Forret Curling Club
Glenfarg Curling Club
Glenfarg Ladies Curling Club
Glenrothes Curling Club
Hercules Curling Club
Hercules Ladies
Inverkeithing Curling Club
K2
Kennoway Curling Club
KCS - After School Club
Kinross Curling Club
Kinross High School
Kinross Junior
Kinross Ladies
Kinross Virtual
Kinross Wheelchair
Kirkcaldy Junior
Largo
Leuchars
Levins
Loch Leven
Lundin & Montrave
Markinch Curling Club
Newport Curling Club
Orwell
Orwell Ladies
Pitlessie Curling Club
Raith and Abbotshall Curling Club
Raith & Abbotshall (Lds)
Rothes
St Andrews
Stratheden Curling Club
Strathkinness
Thornton
Tulliallan
VICKs (Scotland)

Area 11 (Atholl, Breadalbane, Perth & District, Strathmore, Upper Strathearn)
Abercairney
Airleywright
Airleywright Ladies
Ardblair
Auchterarder
Bank of Scotland (Perth & Dist.)
Blackford & Carsebreck
Blair Atholl
Blairgowrie
Breadalbane Aberfeldy
Breadalbane Glendochart
Breadalbane Kenmore
Breadalbane Killin
Clunie
Comrie
Coupar Angus & Kettins
Craigie Hill Curling Club
Crieff & Ochtertyre
Delvine
Drummond Castle
Dunkeld
Dunning
Dunsinane Curling Club
Errol
Findo Gask
Fingask
Forteviot
General Accident
Glendoick
Heath of the Highlands
Kilgraston & Moncreiffe
Kinfauns
Lynedoch Ladies
Methven
Muthill Curling Club
Murthly/Murthly Castle
Perth
Perth Academy
Perth & Kinross Teachers
Perth High School
Perth Junior
Perth Ladies
Perth Virtual
Pitlochry
Pitlochry Ladies
Rattray Curling Club
Rossie
Schiehallion Ladies
Scone & Perth
St Martins
Strathallan Meath Moss
Strathmore
Toberargan
Tullymet

Area 12 (Angus, Dundee & District, North and South Esk, North-Eastern)

Aberdeen Curling Club
Aberdeen & District
Aberdeen Civil Service Curling Club
Aberdeen Grammar School FP
Aberdeen Ladies
Aberdeen Petroleum
Aberdeen Wheelchair
Aberlemno
 Angus Glens Curling Club
AWW Curling Club
Bank of Schotland (Aberdeen)
Balruddery Curling Club
Banchory Curling Club
Bon Accord Pecten (Amalgamated)
Braeknowe
Brechin Castle
Broughty Ferry
Caterthun
Claverhouse
Clydesdale Bank (Aberdeen)
Cocktail
Curl Aberdeen Juniors
 Dalhousie Ladies Curling Club
Donald's 
Dundee Curling Club
Dundee Dragons
Dundee Junior
Dundee Ladies Curling Club
Dun
Dundee Virtual Club
Edzell Curling Club
Evenie Water Curling Club
Fettercairn
Fordoun
 Forfar Curling Club
Forgar Academy
 Forfar Ladies Curling Club
Forfar Virtual
 Forfar Young Curlers
 Fothringham Curling Club
 Glamis Curling Club
Granite City Ladies
Haddo House Curling Club
High School of Dundee
Huntly
Kirriemuir Curling Club
 Kirriemuir & District Ladies Curling Club
Laurencekirk
Letham Grange Curling Club
Lundie & Auchterhouse
Meldrum & Daviot Curling Club
Monifieth
Northern Lights
Panmure
Pitkerro Curling Club
Rubislaw Curling Club
 Suttieside Curling Club
Tarland
Turriff
Ugie
University of Dundee Curling Club

Area 13 (Grampian, Inverness, Moray, Ross & Cromarty, Sutherland)
Aberlour Curling Club
Alness
Ardclach Curling Club
Aviemore
Ballindaloch Curling Club
Bank of Scotland (Highland) Curling Club
Beauly
Belmaduthy
Brora
Buckie
Bught Ladies
Caberfeidh
Cairngorm Ladies Curling Club
Carr-bridge Curling Club
Cawdor Curling Club
Citadel
Culloden Academy
Dalcross Curling Club
Darnaway Curling Club
Dornoch
Elgin Curling Club
Elgin Academy
Elgin Rotary
Elgin Tennis & Curling Club
Fairburn
Fifteen Club
Fochabers Curling Club
Forres Curling Club
Highland
Highland Junior Curlers
Highland Ladies
Highland Virtual
Highland Wheelchair
Highland & Islands DB
Invergordon Academy Curling Club
Inverness
Inverness Hospitals
Inverness Ice Rink Ladies
Killearnan
Kingsmills
Kingussie
Lochaber
Locheye & St. Duthus Curling Club
Loch Fleet
Loch Ness
Moray Firth Ladies
Moray Junior Curling Club
Moray Virtual
Moray Wheelchair
Muir of Ord
Nairn Curling Club
Nairn Academy
Nairn Ladies Curling Club
Northern Constabulary (Inverness)
North Highland Curling Trust
Rogart
Ross-Shire Ladies
Ross Sutherland Farmers
Strathpeffer Spa
Strathspey
Sunninghill
Torness

References
Royal Caledonian Curling Club - List of clubs

 
Curling
Curling
Scotland